Terry Parker High School is a public high school in the Duval County Public School district, located in Jacksonville, Florida. The school celebrated its 50th anniversary in 2005. The school has been named a Blue Ribbon School of Excellence.

Namesake
In 1955, philanthropist H. Terry Parker and his family deeded  of property in Arlington for the erection of a public school in the Duval County area. The Arlington Parent-Teachers Association nominated Parker to be the school's namesake and it was approved by the school board.

In 1958, Parker made a gift of one half the cost of seating and lighting installations at Parker Athletic Field. Sixty red and black wool uniforms were given to Terry Parker Band by Mrs. Parker.

Improvement
Terry Parker was one of 11 schools nationwide selected by the College Board for inclusion in the EXCELerator School Improvement Model program beginning the 2006-2007 school year. The project was funded by the Bill & Melinda Gates Foundation.

Swimming pool
The school has an outdoor pool which is used by the athletic teams and physical education classes during the academic year; then it becomes a free public pool operated by the City of Jacksonville Parks & Recreation Department during the summer months.

Hall of Fame

Thirty Terry Parker High School graduates, former teachers and former staff members were inducted into the school's inaugural Hall of Fame as part of the school's 50th anniversary festivities April 1, 2005. Inductees were selected on the basis of their exemplary achievements in athletics, health and medicine, arts and entertainment, public service, business and industry, volunteerism, philanthropy or education.

References

External links
Terry Parker High School website
Duval County Public Schools website

Educational institutions established in 1955
High schools in Jacksonville, Florida
Duval County Public Schools
Public high schools in Florida
1955 establishments in Florida